"New Day" is a charity single released by Haitian rapper Wyclef Jean and Irish singer-songwriter Bono, in aid of charity NetAid. The song appears on the international version of Jean's second album, The Ecleftic: 2 Sides II a Book. Wyclef and Bono performed the song live at Giants Stadium, New Jersey, at the NetAid launch concert on 9 October 1999.

"New Day" entered the UK Singles Chart at number 23, its highest position, and spent two weeks on the chart. The song also charted in several other countries, finding its highest peak in Italy at number two. The remix of the track features contributions from Bumpy Knuckles, Marie Antoinette, DJ Red Alert, Reptile and Small World. The song was featured on the soundtrack to the 1999 film Life, starring Eddie Murphy and Martin Lawrence, and featured jazz saxophonist Kenny G.

Track listings
UK CD1 (668212 2)
 "New Day" (Pop Radio Edit) (Feat. Bono) - 4:33
 "Gone Till November" - 3:29
 "Cheated" (R&B Remix) (Feat. Queen Pen and The Product) - 4:05

UK CD2 (668212 5)
 "New Day" (Pop Radio Edit) (Feat. Bono) - 4:33
 "New Day" (Hip Hop Clean Version) (Feat. The Refugee Camp) - 3:57
 "New Day" (Reggae Remix) - 3:45

Charts

Weekly charts

Year-end charts

Release history

References

Wyclef Jean songs
1999 singles
1999 songs
Columbia Records singles
Song recordings produced by Jerry Duplessis
Song recordings produced by Wyclef Jean
Songs written by Jerry Duplessis
Songs written by Wyclef Jean